The Kuroda Dam (黒田ダム) is a dam in the city of Toyota in the Aichi Prefecture of Japan.

Hydroelectric power stations in Japan
Dams in Aichi Prefecture
Dams completed in 1980